The Intercontinental Poker Championship was a poker tournament featuring professional poker players representing various nations. 21 players competed in the inaugural event, which was taped at Palms Hotel and Casino April 14-16, 2006, and aired on CBS for seven weeks beginning June 17, 2006. Jeff Medders and Gabe Kaplan provided commentary.

The field of 21 players was split into three groups of seven, each of which participated in a double elimination Texas hold 'em "shootout." The winner from each group of seven advanced to the semi-finals. The remaining six players from each group competed again, with the winner also advancing.

With the field narrowed to six, the remaining players played another double elimination round. The winner advanced to the final table and the remaining five players competed again, with the winner advancing to the heads up final match.

At the best of three heads up final table, Yoshio Nakano of Japan defeated Australia's Tony G two out of three to take down $350,000. Tony G won $150,000 for his second-place finish.

Players
 David Benyamine (France)
 Chris Bjorin (Sweden)
 Humberto Brenes (Costa Rica)
 Doyle Brunson (USA)
 Jimmy Cha (South Korea)
 Johnny Chan (China)
 Eli Elezra (Israel)
 Sam Farha (Lebanon)
 Tony G (Australia)
 Chau Giang (Vietnam)
 Hasan Habib (Pakistan)
 Thor Hansen (Norway)
 Carlos Mortensen (Spain)
 Yosh Nakano (Japan)
 Daniel Negreanu (Canada)
 Donnacha O'Dea (Ireland)
 Ralph Perry (Russia)
 Refugio Quintero (Mexico)
 Marco Traniello (Italy)
 Dave "The Devilfish" Ulliot (England)
 Stephen Wolff (South Africa)

External links
 Intercontinental Poker Championship To Debut This Weekend On CBS

Poker tournaments
Television shows about poker